Yuan Hua may refer to:

 Yuan Hua (judoka), Chinese judoka and Olympic champion
 Yuen Wah (Mandarin: Yuan Hua), Hong Kong actor